Trogkofel (Creta di Aip in Italian) (2,280 m) is a mountain of the Carnic Alps lying on the border of Friuli, Italy and Carinthia, Austria. It is located on the main ridge of the Carnics between the Aip Valley to the south and the Gail Valley in the north, and is the second highest mountain on the eastern ridge after Gailtaler Polinik. The mountain is known as Crete Rosse, meaning Red Rocky Mountain in Friuli.

Climbing
The first recorded ascent took place in 1886 although it is very likely that local hunters reached the summit way before then. The mountain can be climbed with a moderate level of difficulty from all directions. Due to the isolated position of the peak, and its prominence over neighbouring peaks, the summit offers a panoramic view, which includes all of the Carnics, the Dolomites, the Julian Alps, the Gailtal Alps and the High Tauern.

References

Mountains of the Alps
Mountains of Carinthia (state)
Mountains of Friuli-Venezia Giulia